USS Sea Otter may refer to various United States Navy ships:

, a patrol vessel in commission from 1917 to 1919;
, an experimental auxiliary ship in commission from July to November 1941; and
, an experimental auxiliary ship in commission from 1941 to 1942.

Sea Otter